In Greek mythology, Nephele (Ancient Greek: Νεφέλη from νέφος nephos "cloud"; Latinized to Nubes) was a cloud nymph who figured prominently in the story of Phrixus and Helle.

Mythology 
Greek myth has it that Nephele is the cloud whom Zeus created in the image of Hera to trick Ixion to test his integrity after he displayed his lust for Hera during a feast as a guest of Zeus. Ixion's restraint failed him, and he assaulted Nephele, eventually fathering the Centaurs (through Imbros or Centauros).

Nephele married Athamas, and had twins, a son, Phrixus, and a daughter, Helle. Athamas then divorced her for Ino, who hatched a devious plot to get rid of the twins, roasting all the town's crop seeds so they would not grow. The local farmers, frightened of famine, asked a nearby oracle for assistance. Ino bribed the men sent to the oracle to lie and tell the others that the oracle required the sacrifice of Phrixus. Before he was killed though, Phrixus and Helle were rescued by a flying golden ram sent by their natural mother Nephele.

Phrixus and Helle were instructed to not look down to Earth for the duration of their flight. Helle, though, did look down, and fell off the ram into the Hellespont (which was named after her, meaning Sea of Helle) and drowned. Phrixus survived all the way to Colchis, where King Aeetes took him in and treated him kindly, giving Phrixus his daughter, Chalciope, in marriage. In gratitude, Phrixus gave the king the Golden Fleece of the Golden Ram, which Aeetes hung in a tree in his kingdom. The Golden Fleece would later be taken by Jason and his Argonauts.

In modern culture

Film
Cesare Pavese's rendition of the myth was adapted for the screen by the filmmaking duo Jean-Marie Straub and Danièle Huillet (otherwise known as Straub-Huillet) as part of their 1979 film Dalla nube alla resistenza, starring Olimpia Carlisi as Nephele and Guido Lombardi as Ixion.

Music
Animals as Leaders released a progressive metal song named "Nephele" on their 2014 album The Joy of Motion.

See also
 Aries (constellation)
 Ganesha
 Nephilim

Notes

References 

 Gaius Julius Hyginus, Astronomica from The Myths of Hyginus translated and edited by Mary Grant. University of Kansas Publications in Humanistic Studies. Online version at the Topos Text Project.
 Gaius Julius Hyginus, Fabulae from The Myths of Hyginus translated and edited by Mary Grant. University of Kansas Publications in Humanistic Studies. Online version at the Topos Text Project.
 John Tzetzes, Book of Histories, Book IX-X translated by Jonathan Alexander from the original Greek of T. Kiessling's edition of 1826.  Online version at theio.com
 Pseudo-Apollodorus, The Library with an English Translation by Sir James George Frazer, F.B.A., F.R.S. in 2 Volumes, Cambridge, MA, Harvard University Press; London, William Heinemann Ltd. 1921. . Online version at the Perseus Digital Library. Greek text available from the same website.

Nymphs
Family of Athamas
Childhood goddesses
Boeotian mythology
Metamorphoses into humanoids in Greek mythology